Eriya Kategaya (4 July 1945 – 2 March 2013) was a Ugandan lawyer and politician. At the time of his death he was Uganda's First Deputy Prime Minister and Minister for East African Community Affairs. He was also an ex officio Member of the Ugandan Parliament, on account of being a cabinet minister.

Background
He was born on 4 July 1943 in Karagwe Itojo, Ntungamo District, in Western Uganda. Eriya Kategaya was a longtime associate of President Yoweri Museveni, starting from their school days in Ntare School. They studied together at Mbarara High School and later at Ntare School from 1961 to 1966. Kategaya and Museveni also attended the University of Dar es Salaam at the same time.

Education
Kategaya held a Bachelor of Laws (LLB), degree from the University of Dar-es-Salaam. At the time of his graduation the university was part of the University of East Africa.

Military and political training
Kategaya was part of Museveni's Front for National Salvation (FRONASA), a group of Ugandan exiles in Tanzania who eventually helped topple Idi Amin in 1979 with the help of the Tanzania People's Defence Force. In 1980, he was a founder of the Uganda Patriotic Movement, headed by Museveni to contest in the elections. When Museveni launched the guerrilla struggle against the Milton Obote II administration (1981 - 1985), Kategaya served in the 'External Wing' of the rebel National Resistance Movement (NRM) and National Resistance Army (NRA). The NRM transformed into the National Resistance Movement political party, while the NRA became the Uganda People's Defence Force (UPDF). He was a Brigadier General in the National Resistance Army from 1987 holding army number RO-002 although he never served in any military position as he was all the time serving in other government offices as a senior cabinet minister.

Political career
When the NRM and NRA eventually took power in January 1986, Kategaya was one of the groups' top leadership and considered by most as the Number Two after Museveni. Between 1986 and 2001, Kategaya served in various capacities as National Political Commissar for the NRM and Minister in Museveni's governments.

During Museveni's second term as elected President (2001 - 2006), Kategaya, then serving as Internal Affairs Minister, famously fell out with the President when he opposed moves to have the Constitution amended to remove presidential term limits. In May 2003, he was dropped from his ministerial position during a Cabinet reshuffle, along with other ministers who opposed the removal of term limits. Kategaya continued to speak out against amending the term limits provision until eventually the heavily pro-Museveni Parliament pushed the amendment through.

From the time he was dropped from the Cabinet, Kategaya returned to practice as a private lawyer with J.B.Byamugisha Advocates, a law firm based in Kampala.

In December 2004, he participated in the formation of the Forum for Democratic Change (FDC) an anti-Museveni coalition which went on to become the main opposition group in Uganda after the 2006 general elections. Kategaya, however, maintained a low profile and rarely participated in FDC affairs.

Following Museveni and NRM's win in the 2006 general elections, rumours began spreading that Kategaya was in reconciliation talks with Museveni. The rumours proved well-founded when Museveni nominated his old ally for approval by the Parliament as a Cabinet Minister. Subsequently, he was appointed to the posts of Deputy Prime Minister and Minister for East African Community Affairs. Kategaya has been instrumental in the continued growth of the East African Community.

In the cabinet reshuffle of 27 May 2011, Eriya Kategaya maintained all his cabinet posts.

Eriya Kategaya died on 2 March 2013 in Nairobi, where he had been hospitalised for a while.

See also
 Cabinet of Uganda
 Parliament of Uganda
 Ntungamo District

References

External links
 

1945 births
2013 deaths
Foreign Ministers of Uganda
Interior ministers of Uganda
20th-century Ugandan lawyers
Forum for Democratic Change politicians
People educated at Ntare School
University of Dar es Salaam alumni
People from Ntungamo District
Members of the Parliament of Uganda
People educated at Mbarara High School
21st-century Ugandan lawyers